Charles William Corrigan Oliver (born 17 November 1997) is an English semi-professional footballer who plays for  club Southport as a defender. He is a product of the Manchester City Academy.

Career

Manchester City 
A defender, Oliver joined the Manchester City Academy at the age of 8. He progressed to sign a professional contract at the age of 18 and broke into the EDS. He made three appearances during the EDS' 2017–18 EFL Trophy campaign and on 31 January 2018, joined League One club Fleetwood Town on loan until the end of the 2017–18 season. He made the first professional appearance of his career three days later, as a substitute for Conor McAleny after 44 minutes of a 3–2 defeat to Scunthorpe United. It proved to be the only appearance of Oliver's spell, as he dropped out of the first team squad after the appointment of new head coach John Sheridan on 22 February 2018. Oliver played for the Development Squad in its run to the 2018 Lancashire Senior Cup Final and departed Highbury when his loan expired.

On 31 August 2018, Oliver joined the B team at Championship club Brentford on loan until 1 January 2019. He made 15 appearances for the B team before the expiration of his loan. He departed Manchester City at the end of the campaign, when his contract expired.

Southport 
On 15 November 2019, Oliver joined National League North club Southport on a free transfer. On 4 March 2020, three days prior to his 19th and final appearance of the cancelled 2019–20 season, it was announced that Oliver had signed a new one-year contract. Oliver made 18 appearances during the 2020–21 season (which was again curtailed) and signed further contract extensions for the 2021–22 and 2022–23 seasons respectively. He was a part of the team which won the 2021–22 Lancashire FA Challenge Trophy.

Career statistics

Honours 
Southport

 Lancashire FA Challenge Trophy: 2021–22
Individual

 Southport Player of the Month: October 2022

References

External links

1997 births
Living people
Association football defenders
English footballers
Manchester City F.C. players
Fleetwood Town F.C. players
Brentford F.C. players
English Football League players
Southport F.C. players
National League (English football) players